The Nomenclature of Territorial Units for Statistics (NUTS) is a geocode standard for referencing the subdivisions of Bulgaria for statistical purposes. The standard is developed and regulated by the European Union. The NUTS standard is instrumental in delivering the European Union's Structural Funds. The NUTS code for Bulgaria is BG and a hierarchy of three levels is established by Eurostat. Below these is a further levels of geographic organisation - the local administrative unit (LAU). In Bulgaria, the LAU 1 is municipalities and the LAU 2 is settlements.

Overall

NUTS Levels

Local Administrative Units 

Below the NUTS levels, the two LAU (Local Administrative Units) levels are:

The LAU codes of Bulgaria can be downloaded here:

NUTS codes

In the 2003 version, the codes were as follows:
 BG1 North Bulgaria
 BG11 North West
 BG111 Vidin
 BG112 Montana
 BG113 Vratsa
 BG12 North Central
 BG121 Pleven
 BG122 Lovech
 BG123 Veliko Tarnovo
 BG124 Gabrovo
 BG125 Ruse
 BG13 North East
 BG131 Varna
 BG132 Dobrich
 BG133 Shumen
 BG134 Targovishte
 BG135 Razgrad
 BG136 Silistra
 BG2 South Bulgaria
 BG21 South West
 BG211 Grad Sofiya
 BG212 Sofiya
 BG213 Blagoevgrad
 BG214 Pernik
 BG215 Kyustendil
 BG22 South Central
 BG221 Plovdiv
 BG222 Stara Zagora
 BG223 Haskovo
 BG224 Pazardzhik
 BG225 Smolyan
 BG226 Kardzhali
 BG23 South East
 BG231 Burgas
 BG232 Sliven
 BG233 Yambol

NUTS 2 regions redrawing
Some of the present NUTS II regions of Bulgaria no longer meet the relevant technical requirements, mostly due to general population decline and increasing regional disproportion. A 2013 study by FLGR Consult commissioned by the Ministry of Regional Development and Public Works analyzed the state and trends of change in the characteristics of these regions to identify several options for the pending redrawing of the NUTS II map of the country. The process was restarted in 2017 with certain modified versions considered, and final decision due by the end of 2018. The relevant Regional Development (Amendment) Bill, released for public consultation by the Council of Ministers in October 2018, is based on a four-regions version chosen from the shortlist of three options developed by an inter-ministerial working group led by the Ministry of Regional Development and Public Works.

See also
 Subdivisions of Bulgaria
 ISO 3166-2 codes of Bulgaria
 FIPS region codes of Bulgaria
List of Bulgarian regions by Human Development Index

Notes

Sources
 Hierarchical list of the Nomenclature of territorial units for statistics - NUTS and the Statistical regions of Europe
 Overview map of EU Countries - NUTS level 1
 BULGARIA - NUTS level 2
 BULGARIA - NUTS level 3
 Correspondence between the NUTS levels and the national administrative units
 List of current NUTS codes
 Download current NUTS codes (ODS format)
 Regions of Bulgaria, Statoids.com

Bulgaria
Nuts